General elections were held in the Democratic Republic of the Congo on July 30, 2006. They were the first multiparty elections in the country in 41 years, and the first since the overthrow of longtime leader Mobutu Sese Seko nine years earlier. Voters went to the polls to elect both a new President of the Republic and a new National Assembly, the lower-house of the Parliament.

The polls were boycotted by the veteran opposition leader, Étienne Tshisekedi, who complained of fraud. The international community donated $460 million to fund the elections and deployed the world's largest UN peacekeeping operation, MONUC, to help the stability of the election. While the election was conducted relatively peacefully, the collection of the results proved chaotic, leading to armed clashes and growing fears of instability. As a result, DRC election officials announced that they would begin to release partial results earlier instead of only announcing the final count on August 20.

On August 20, the CEI released its full provisional presidential election results, indicating that neither candidate was able to secure a majority, which led to a run-off election on October 29. On that day, voters went to the polls to vote in:
a run-off election for the Presidency, as no candidate had obtained more than 50 percent of the first-round vote.
an election of provincial parliaments

On November 15, the CEI released its full provisional results for the presidential election's second round, indicating that Joseph Kabila had won. The results were, however, rejected by Bemba who claimed irregularities. On November 27, the DRC Supreme Court confirmed that Kabila had won the election.

Registration and voter turnout
Over 25 million people registered to vote for the elections, in a country where the exact population is not known, but is likely in excess of 60 million. The Independent Electoral Commission (CEI or La Commission Electorale Indépendante) reported a voter turnout of 80 percent.

Candidates
Thirty-three people registered as candidates for the Presidency and 9,000 for the 500 seats in the federal parliament.

The initial presidential favourites were Joseph Kabila, the incumbent, and Jean-Pierre Bemba, one of the four vice-presidents.

Conduct

At least six people were killed in violent street protests in the run-up to the election.

As of July 30, most polling stations were reported to have opened on time, with the election remaining peaceful. The election closely followed an agreement with Ituri militias on July 28, an agreement which MONUC has stated "greatly enhances the security situation in the province in the lead-up to the historic DRC elections."

Violence in Kasai
Presumed supporters of Étienne Tshisekedi burned polling stations and voting materials in the city of Mbuji-Mayi, capital of East Kasai province, on Sunday to prevent the elections being held. The elections were extended until Monday and riot police were deployed. The Economist stated President Kabila was "making full use of his control of the security services and his monopoly of the state media" to secure the election. A report by Human Rights Watch detailed violence in the campaign. In one raid, "agents of the special police" stormed a Christian television station, arresting a pastor critical of the political process, beating technicians and destroying the broadcasting equipment. The government also imprisoned a journalist for "insulting the head of state." Shooting of protestors by soldiers was routine.

Fraud allegations
On the day of the election three vice-presidents and candidates complained of vote rigging. Bemba, Ruberwa and Z'Ahidi said "Perhaps we are heading for a masquerade or a parody of elections".

Clashes in Kinshasa

Starting on August 20 heavy armed clashes took place in Kinshasa between forces loyal to Kabila and Bemba. Both sides accused the other of starting the fighting.

On August 21, while a meeting between Bemba and foreign ambassadors representing the International Committee Accompanying the Transition to Democracy (CIAT) was taking place in Kinshasa, clashes broke out between Kabila and Bemba forces, and Bemba's residence, which hosted the meeting, came under attack. According to one diplomat in the residence, it included artillery and heavy machine gun fire. Bemba and the diplomats were moved to the safety of the residence's shelter and there were no reports of injuries. Evacuation plans for the diplomats stranded in the shelter were reportedly being drawn up. Bemba's private helicopter was said to have been destroyed in the attack. Several hours later, the UN spokesperson in the DRC, Jean-Tobias Okala, announced that the foreign diplomats, including MONUC chief William Swing, had been successfully evacuated to UN headquarters by Spanish and Uruguayan peace-keeping forces after a top Kabila general and UN forces commander cooperated to allow them safe passage.

Once the rescue had been completed, fighting in the DRC capital ensued, and on August 22, two DRC army tanks were reported to be heading toward the latest area of fighting. The EU began sending more peacekeeping troops to Kinshasa and MONUC chief Swing called for an immediate ceasefire. Later on August 22, the third day of fighting, the two sides signed a tentative ceasefire agreement to withdraw from the centre of Kinshasa. AFP reported that "the deal was signed by representatives of Kabila and Bemba, DRC army, the UN mission MONUC, European force EUFOR and European police mission EUROPOL, meeting as a "working group" at MONUC's Kinshasa headquarters." At least three people died during Tuesday's fighting. Sixteen people were reported killed in the fighting which saw heavy artillery and machine gun fire, with police reporting more bodies found and the death toll expected to rise considerably. Later in the day, Interior Minister Theophile Mbemba Fundu placed the death toll for the week at 23 killed, 43 injured. As of August 24, the ceasefire remained in effect, with army forces loyal to the two candidates remaining in barracks, but the situation remained unstable. Later in the day, police fired shots in the air to disperse angry crowds demanding that two of Bemba's television stations be reopened. South African Airways announced that flights to Kinshasa would be resumed on August 25 after being suspended since the fighting began.

On August 26, Kabila and Bemba announced that the two had agreed to meet. Later in the day, however, tensions were heightened as Bemba failed to attend the meeting. On August 29, MONUC announced that representatives of Kabila and Bemba were due to meet under UN supervision. Later in the day, it was reported that Kabila and Bemba themselves met for the first time since the clashes began. On August 30, MONUC announced that the meeting resulted in the establishment of two joint sub-commissions, one to conduct an independent investigation of the clashes, and the other to devise rules which will prevent violence from recurring during October 29 run-off election.

Results
Preliminary results were expected on August 2, but due to the remoteness of many polling stations, results were not expected to be finalised until three weeks after the polls closed. While South African observers approved the election, other monitors expressed concern, including those from the Carter Center. MONUC reported that on August 3, on the third day of "chaotic poll-counting, a suspicious fire at a major Kinshasa election center deepened concerns over the transparency of the results." According to MONUC, while the election itself may have met requirements, "the process of collecting results from 50,000 polling stations had become chaotic." On August 6, MONUC predicted that President Joseph Kabila appeared most likely to win, with Jean-Pierre Bemba finishing second.

On August 5, thousands in eastern DRC were fleeing clashes between the DRC army and forces affiliated with General Laurent Nkunda. DRC officials reported that two government soldiers were killed in the fighting. According to The Independent, Nkunda, who is "widely believed to be in third place in the race for the DRC's presidency," stated that he would respect the results, but along with over 30 other candidates, expressed "determination to resist results which are perceived to be unfair." Nkunda, who remained the subject of an international arrest warrant issued by the DRC government "for alleged atrocities against civilians committed since 2004," expressed a willingness to negotiate with the winner of the election, but also, determination to resist any military attack. MONUC spokesperson reported that the peacekeeping force had begun patrolling in the area and that fighting has become limited to isolated incidents.

While the official provisional election results were not to be announced until August 20, on August 7, due to the tense climate brought by the chaotic collection of results and after pressure from international envoys (led by South Africa), the DRC Electoral Commission stated that it would begin releasing interim election results as soon as the 20 percent vote count threshold was reached. On August 8, some results were released, indicating that Kabila "overwhelmingly won" in the east while Bemba won in the west. A UN representative stated that it is too early to declare a winner. Preliminary national results were not expected until at least August 14. On August 12, the DRC Independent Electoral Commission announced that six poll officials have been arrested for attempting to falsify the election results. The officials were arrested on August 10, and appeared in court on August 11. On August 15, the IEC reported that 94 percent of the presidential votes and 44 percent of the parliamentary results had been counted. MONUC cautioned against media speculation on the results, while the instability in eastern DRC continued.

On August 16, Angola deployed four battalions along the DRC border. The Angolan army's Deputy Chief of Staff, General Geraldo Sachipendo Nunda, said that these were steps taken "to ensure the security of our borders," although it was speculated that Angola was preparing to intervene, if the need arose, in favor of Kabila. On August 17, the UN began investigating a suspected child prostitution ring involving UN peacekeepers and members of the DRC army. Also on August 17, MONUC chief William Lacy Swing, warned against hate messages in local Bemba-run media which called on Congolese to target white people and foreigners. This was in response to a widespread perception that Kabila's election had been backed by the international community. In response, the Congolese High Authority on Media suspended the RTAE and CCTV (owned by Bemba) television stations for twenty-four hours. The government-owned Congolese Broadcasting Corporation television station, controlled by Kabila, also received a twenty-four-hour suspension.

President

The CEI released its full provisional results for the presidential election on August 20. The DRC Supreme Court planned to announce the final official presidential election results on August 31. The CEI was set to release the results of the parliamentary election in early September. Both events ended up being postponed.

On August 20, with almost all the votes from the country's 169 constituencies having been counted, the DRC headed toward a run-off election. There were reports of automatic gunfire in Kinshasa, and MLC representatives accused Kabila's Republican Guard of killing one of its men and injuring three policemen. The armed clashes resulted in the long-awaited CEI announcement ceremony being delayed by several hours. Full provisional results show Kabila with 44.81 percent of the vote, to Bemba's 20.03. Gizenga secured about 13 percent, Mobutu about 5 percent and Kashala around 4 percent.

On September 5, the DRC Supreme Court, which was set to release the official results of the election's first round, announced it would be postponing doing so pending two legal challenges which might deem the forthcoming second round of elections unconstitutional. MONUC, however, stated on September 6 that it is satisfied with the electoral process, but expressed concern over the humanitarian situation.

During late October 2006, as the date for the presidential run-off approached, security concerns were increasingly expressed. On October 26, the CEI stated that the North Kivu province could see security threats. While MONUC stated that they "'do not foresee any major problems,'" the next day, October 27, UN Secretary-General Kofi Annan stated that he was "very concerned about the increasing level of violence as election day approaches" The head of the South African observer mission, Mluleki George, stated, however, that he expected the election would "'be held under normal and peaceful conditions.'" As well, rebel leader Laurent Nkunda reiterated he would respect the results, a pledge which was also expressed by Bemba.

On October 29, the South African Broadcasting Corporation (which a day earlier had condemned police violence against its correspondent) reported that despite delays in the Kinshasa area, caused by heavy rains, voting was "running smoothly in most other parts of the DRC." The African Union hailed "the smooth conduct" of the election and appealed for calm as vote counting began. Carter Center chief observer, former Canadian Prime Minister Joe Clark, stated that "attempted manipulation of the electoral process, while very serious in a few cases, appear at this point to be isolated and unlikely to affect the overall success of the vote."

During the first day of voting, violent clashes in the Equateur province resulted in two fatalities. MONUC stated later in the day that "the situation has returned to calm and voting operations are taking place normally throughout Equateur." Additional reports of clashes remained unconfirmed, but these appeared to have been limited to Equateur. On October 30, as vote counting began, MONUC reported that a soldier killed two poll workers in the town of Fataki, Ituri Province, resulting in riots which led to the destruction of 43 polling stations. The reason for the shooting remain unclear, but it appears that the soldier was drunk. The soldier has been sentenced to death for the murders.

The results of the presidential run-off were to be released on November 19, 2006. On October 30, voter turnout was estimated to have been low.
The head of the CEI, Apollinaire Malumalu, warned on November 1 against releasing partial preliminary results to prevent the same violent clashes which followed during the election's first round. Three days later, however, the CEI decided to prerelease partial preliminary results to stem the spread of rumours, a decision analogous to the unscheduled prerelease that took place during the first round. On November 6, results from 12 of 169 constituencies showed Kabila in the lead. On November 8, the two candidates met and issued calls for calm. The meeting came as accusations from Bemba's coalition were directed against the CEI for skewing the results in favour of Kabila, a claim dismissed by a CEI official as false and inflammatory.

On November 10, with votes from 112 of 169 constituencies counted and a voter turnout of about 67 percent, Kabila was leading with about 60 percent of the votes. The final results were released by the CEI on November 15 and were confirmed by the Supreme Court on November 27.

National Assembly
On August 25, MONUC announced that the parliamentary results would be released as early as that day, but as of August 27, they had yet to be released. On August 28, the CEI began releasing the legislative results, with the final count expected September 4. On September 4, the CEI postponed releasing the results of the parliamentary elections by at least a day following the arrest of ten Bemba-affiliated election officials. Still, the CEI announced that these problems would not affect the results. The results so far released, show Kabila at a strong lead with 45% of the seats to Bemba's 14%, the remaining going to other parties. Of the 500 parliamentary seats, 58 have yet to be released.

On September 8, the CEI released the results, revealing that no single party gained the 251 seats needed to secure a majority. Kabila's PPRD won 111 seats, while Bemba's MLC won 64 seats. As of that date, the CEI was to have fifteen days to set the date for the first session of parliament, notwithstanding any Supreme Court rulings on its final composition.

Aftermath
On November 11, a shootout took place for several hours after police had fired shots in the air to disperse Bemba supporters who were demonstrating near Bemba's residence in Kinshasa to protest vote counting during the run-off. The shooting ceased after MONUC mediated a meeting between representatives of the two groups. At least four people were reported to have died in the clashes. On November 13, DRC police arrested 337 people, including 87 children, suspected to have been involved in November 11 clashes.

After being declared winner, Kabila hinted that Bemba would play a role in the new government, stating that "the effort now must be nation building, it must be reconstruction. The government that will be put in place will be a government of coalition." Bemba, who boycotted the hearings after the Supreme Court refused to consider further challenges over alleged "systematic cheating", was not immediately available for comment.  On November 28, Bemba released a statement saying that while he condemns the ruling, he accepts the results and is prepared to lead a "strong republican opposition in the interests of the nation". Kabila was sworn in as president on December 6.

Bemba rejects results
On November 14, Bemba rejected the results of the election, which showed Kabila with 60 to Bemba's 40 percent, with 90 percent of the votes (159 out of 169 constituencies) having been counted. Bemba's supporters stated that "the Union for the Nation will not accept an electoral hold-up that aims to steal victory from the Congolese people", and that they were not bound by their promise to accept the results if they thought there was electoral fraud. Bemba's UFN coalition maintained he was leading with 52 to Kabila's 48 percent.

On November 17, Bemba told reporters that he rejected the interim results, citing irregularities. He said that he "cannot accept the results that are far from reflecting the truth of the election results," and that he would "use all the legal channels to respect the will of our people." Bemba, on November 18, filed a complaint to the Supreme Court over his claims of electoral irregularities. A member of his UFN coalition had said that: "there were many, many irregularities. It was not at all democratic. We are confident the supreme court will correct the result."

Supreme Court fire
On November 21, part of the Supreme Court building was burned down amid gunfire during a session in which the Court was reviewing an electoral fraud complaint. No casualties were reported. The direct cause for the fire was unclear, but it followed a demonstration by Bemba supporters who were seeking entry into the building. According to Interior Minister Denis Kalume, "armed men who infiltrated the demonstrators opened fire on the police and from then everything went haywire." MONUC, who evacuated judges, lawyers, and CEI officials from the building, attributed the incident to "uncontrolled elements." On November 22, it was announced that the Supreme Court would be relocated to several parts of the capital, and possibly, the country. The South African observation mission and the Carter Center both expressed approval of the second round. Bemba's coalition lawyer Delly Sesanga, however, argued in favour of "the cancellation of the poll" due to "too many irregularities." Tensions remained high after the DRC army surrounded Bemba's compound in Kinshasa.

Kabila issues ultimatum to Bemba
On November 23, about 50 soldiers of Bemba's security detail in Kinshasa, estimated at 600-to-1,000 soldiers, left his residence there and were moved to one in Maluku following pressure by Kabila for Bemba to move some, or all, of his troops within 48 hours. A Kabila official, however, said that this was "absolutely not an ultimatum." Another 100 of Bemba's troops were expected to leave the capital later in the day.
On November 24, the "ultimatum" expired with few, if any, additional Bemba troops removed from the capital. This made it increasingly likely that Kabila would order the DRC army, which continued to surround Bemba's compound, to remove Bemba's soldiers itself. Such an act would greatly increase the likelihood for further armed confrontations. MONUC has said that, if needed, its peacekeepers will help the DRC army to enforce the ultimatum.

Offensive by Nkunda in Sake
On November 25, forces loyal to General Laurent Nkunda engaged more than 2,000 soldiers against the DRC army 11th Brigade around the town of Sake (near Goma), Nord-Kivu. Three soldiers and three civilians were killed, and close to 20 people were wounded. MONUC has sent 1,000 soldiers to secure the area. According to UN, "'15 000 and 20 000 people had been displaced by the fighting.'" MONUC spokesperson said that by morning "there were still some shots, but calm was mostly restored," and that Nkunda forces had retreated back and "all of the 11th Brigades's positions are under control," On November 26, MONUC reported that it had clashed with Nkunda's forces who were moving toward Goma, stating: "we fired warning shots from attack helicopters and our troops on the ground have engaged them in Sake."
It was later suggested that the attack may not have been related to the election, but rather, was in reaction to the "killing of a Tutsi civilian who was close to one of the commanders in this group." The UN called on the DRC government to negotiate with Nkunda and on November 27, DRC Interior Minister, General Denis Kalume, was sent to eastern DRC to begin negotiations. Sporadic fire was still reported on November 29.

Supreme Court decision
On November 24, three days after the fire, the Supreme Court resumed its activities in a small, heavily guarded room in the Ministry of Foreign Affairs. Bemba lawyers, however, questioned the impartiality and number of judges involved, arguing that too many of them favour Kabila. Bemba's lead attorney Jean-Marie Tshibangu stated that: "it is not the competence of the court but the competence of its composition that we are challenging." On November 26, presiding judge Kalonda Kele said a ruling over Bemba's challenge would be announced the next day.

On November 27, the Supreme Court dismissed Bemba's challenge as "unfounded" and confirmed that Kabila had won the election, stating that: "Mr Kabila Kabange, Joseph, is proclaimed president of the Democratic Republic of Congo, elected by absolute majority."

References

External links
DRC Independent Electoral Commission
Legislative election results in full
"Countdown in Congo" special from IRIN

Elections in the Democratic Republic of the Congo
DR Congo
General
Presidential elections in the Democratic Republic of the Congo
Democratic Republic of the Congo general election